Jon DeRosa (born December 21, 1978) is an American musician and singer-songwriter. He has been involved with several critically acclaimed acts, including Dead Leaves Rising, Pale Horse and Rider, and as well as his solo-project known as Aarktica.

His most recent solo album Black Halo was released on May 25, 2015, on Rocket Girl Records. The album was produced by longtime collaborator Charles Newman and features a song co-written by Stephen Merritt of The Magnetic Fields.

Music career

Jon DeRosa Solo discography 
 Anchored EP (2011)
 A Wolf in Preacher's Clothes (2012)
 Black Halo (2015)

Aarktica Discography

In Sea Remixes  Silber Records (2010)
In Sea  |  Silber Records (2009)
Matchless Years CD  |  Darla Records (2007)
Live at KUCI (digital release)  |  Silber Records (2006)
Bleeding Light  |  Darla Records (2005)
Pure Tone Audiometry |  Silber Records (2003)
Or you could just go through your whole life…  |  Darla Records (2002)
Morning One CD EP |  Ochre Records (2001)
No Solace in Sleep CD  |  Silber Records (2000)

Pale Horse and Rider
Pale Horse and Rider was a short-lived collaboration between DeRosa and Marc Gartman. Their recordings featured a variety of performers in supporting roles, including Alan Sparhawk (Low), Nathan Amundson (Rivulets), Charles Newman (Flare, Mother West), Paul Oldham (Palace Brothers) and Mike Pride.

Discography
Moody Pike CD  |  Darla Records (US)  |  Agenda Records (UK) (2005)
These Are The New Good Times |  Darla Records (2003)
The Alcohol EP  |  Silber Records (2002)

References

External links 

High & Lonely Music Video directed by The Current Sea

American indie rock musicians
American rock guitarists
American male guitarists
American male singer-songwriters
American rock songwriters
American rock singers
Living people
1978 births
People from Lodi, New Jersey
Singer-songwriters from New Jersey
Guitarists from New Jersey
21st-century American singers
21st-century American guitarists
21st-century American male singers
Rocket Girl artists
Darla Records artists